Brian Gilbert Greenway (born October 1, 1951) is a Canadian musician who is the second-longest-serving member of the rock band April Wine, which he joined in 1977 and performs guitar, harmonica, and vocals duties. Prior to joining April Wine he was a member of the bands Mashmakhan and the Dudes. Greenway initially performed with April Wine from 1977 to 1986 when the band split, and again from 1992 to the present day.

After founding member Myles Goodwyn disbanded April Wine in 1986, Greenway embarked a solo career and recorded his debut album Serious Business, which continued the traditional April Wine mix of hard rock and ballads. It is often said that Greenway is responsible for giving April Wine their "harder edged" sound.

In 2016, Greenway formed a band called Brian Greenway's Blues Bus with former April Wine bandmate Gary Moffet (guitar/vocals), along with Craig Miller (harp/vocals), Mark Higden (drums), and Lloyd Dallaire (bass).

TV special
In 1991, Greenway became the subject of his own hour-long TV special entitled Brian Greenway and Friends. The show featured Greenway and his ensemble of friends (keyboardist Jimmy Tanaka, guitarist Jeff Smallwood, bassist Jeff Nystrom, supporting vocalist and percussionist Nanette Workman, and former Mashmakhan/April Wine drummer Jerry Mercer) performing songs from both his 1988 solo project and April Wine catalogue. This In-Concert special was video-taped live in Laval, Quebec by CFCF-Channel 12 Montreal, and broadcast nationally by CTV-Canada on August 7, 1991, and February 15, 1992.

Discography

with April Wine 

 First Glance (1978)
 Harder... Faster (1979)
 Monsters of Rock (1980)
 The Nature of the Beast (1981)
 Power Play (1982)
 Animal Grace (1984)
 Walking Through Fire (1985)
 The Hits (1987)
 All the Rockers (1987)
 We Like to Rock (1988)
 Oowatanite (1990)
 The April Wine Collection (1992)
 Attitude (1993)
 Frigate (1994)
 Champions of Rock (1996)
 Greatest Hits Live (1999)
 Rock Champions (2000)
 Back to the Mansion (2001)
 I Like to Rock (2002)
 Classic Masters (2002)
 Greatest Hits Live 2003 (2003)
 From the Front Row ... Live! (2003)
 Best of April Wine (2003)
 Roughly Speaking (2006)
 April Wine Rocks! (2006)
 First Glance / Harder.....Faster (2007)
 The Hard & Heavy Collection (2009)
 Animal Grace / Walking Through Fire (2009)
 The Nature of the Beast / Power Play (2012)
 Future Tense... Live In Toronto 21 Nov 82 (2015)

with Mashmakhan 

 Mashmakhan (1970)
 The Family (1971)

with the Dudes 

 We're No Angels (CBS/Columbia, 1975)
 All the Young Dudes, All the Old Demos (Pacemaker, 1997)

Solo 

 Serious Business (1988)

See also
 Music of Canada

References

External links
 April Wine's official website

April Wine members
Mashmakhan members
Canadian rock guitarists
Canadian male guitarists
Canadian harmonica players
Canadian male singers
Canadian rock singers
Canadian singer-songwriters
Living people
1951 births
People from Hawkesbury, Ontario